Potentilla diversifolia or Potentilla × diversifolia is a species of flowering plant in the Rose Family (Rosaceae) known by the common names varileaf cinquefoil, different-leaved cinquefoil, and mountain meadow cinquefoil.

Distribution and habitat
It is native to North America, where it grows in moist habitat in many regions, in Alaska to Greenland, the Pacific Northwest and the Rocky Mountains, and from California to New Mexico.

Festuca association
This cinquefoil is a dominant plant in association with the grass Festuca idahoensis on the alpine slopes of mountainous western Montana and central Idaho.

Description

Potentilla diversifolia has gray-green leaves divided into usually five leaflets, which are mostly hairless and are deeply lobed or have teeth along their distal margins. Most of the leaves are low on the stem, with smaller ones occurring above. The inflorescence is a cyme of several flowers. Each has a small corolla of yellow petals above a calyx of five pointed sepals and five narrower bractlets.

Varieties
There are three Potentilla diversifolia varieties: 
Potentilla diversifolia var. diversifolia occurs throughout western North America from Alaska, the Sierra Nevada in California, to the southern Rockies in New Mexico
Potentilla diversifolia var. perdissecta occurs in and around the Rocky Mountains of Canada and the United States
Potentilla diversifolia var. ranunculus can be found in Eastern Canada and Greenland.

References

External links
Jepson Manual Treatment: var. diversifolia
Washington Burke Museum
Potentilla diversifolia var. diversifolia - U.C.B. Photo Gallery

diversifolia
Flora of the Western United States
Flora of Eastern Canada
Flora of Western Canada
Flora of Greenland
Flora of Alaska
Flora of Idaho
Flora of Montana
Flora of California
Flora of New Mexico
Flora of the Rocky Mountains
Flora of the Sierra Nevada (United States)
Flora of the West Coast of the United States
Flora without expected TNC conservation status